Go Min-si (born February 15, 1995) is a South Korean actress, model and director managed by Mystic Story Entertainment. She is known for her prominent roles in Sweet Home, Love Alarm, Youth of May, and  The Witch. She is also known for directing Parallel Novel.

Career 
Go Min-si made her directorial debut in the 2016 film Parallel Novel in which she co-starred and for which she won the Grand Prize during the Three Minutes Film Festival. The same year, she gained popularity after appearing in the third season of the web series 72 Seconds. She also appeared in the music video of "Sign" by Thunder.

In 2017, Go was cast in the web series Absolutely Perfect Man. She also made her television debut in the historical drama My Sassy Girl, before appearing in the youth drama Hello, My Twenties! 2 and in the fantasy drama Meloholic.

In 2018, Go made a cameo appearance in the comedy television series Welcome to Waikiki and in the drama Live. She also joined the cast of Forgotten Season, which is the second series of KBS Drama Special'''s ninth season, and the mystery thriller series The Smile Has Left Your Eyes. She appeared in the film Cheese in the Trap, which is an adaptation of the series of the same name, and in The Witch: Part 1. The Subversion. For the latter, she was nominated for Best Supporting Actress at the 55th Grand Bell Awards and she won the Popular Star Award at the 7th Korea Best Star Awards.

In 2019, Go took on the role of Hwaja, the protagonist's sister, in the Korean-Japanese period action film The Battle: Roar to Victory. She accepted a supporting role in the Netflix series Love Alarm in which she portrayed the lead character's cousin. Go also appeared in the thriller television series Secret Boutique for which she won Best New Actress at the 2019 SBS Drama Awards.

In 2020, Go appeared in the KBS Drama Special The Reason Why I Can't Tell You, in the drama film Set Play and in the Netflix series Sweet Home, adapted from the webtoon of the same name.

In 2021, Go starred in KBS2's Youth of May,  a drama set in 1980 during the Gwangju Uprising. The same year, she appeared in the mystery action series Jirisan, reuniting her with director Lee Eung-bok after Sweet Home. and in May 2021, Go to star in upcoming the film Smuggler, expected to be filmed in June 2021.

In 2022, Go starred in the web series Reincarnation Romance'', a short web series advertising about motion sickness pills. This is her third reunion with Lee Do-hyun.

Filmography

Film

Television series

Web series

Television shows

Music video appearances

Awards and nominations

References

External links 
 Go Min-si at Mystic Story 

 
 

1995 births
Living people
People from Daejeon
South Korean television actresses
South Korean film actresses
21st-century South Korean actresses
Mystic Entertainment artists
South Korean women film directors
South Korean web series actresses